American Casino is an American reality television series which tracks the daily events of the managers and employees of the Green Valley Ranch Casino resort in Henderson, Nevada, a suburb of Las Vegas. The show began airing on the Discovery Channel on June 4, 2004, but was moved to the Travel Channel in June 2005. In other countries including Europe, the show continued to air on Discovery.

The show was executive produced by Craig Piligian of Pilgrim Films & Television. Piligian had also created American Chopper and American Hot Rod.

Subjects 

Subjects of the show have included:
 Pat Kearns - SVP of Operations
 Dan Wilson - VP of Marketing
 Joe Hasson - General Manager
 Ralph Marano - Assistant General Manager
 Wayne Shadd - Director of Marketing
 David Demontmollin - Marketing Manager
 Michael Tata - Vice-President of Hotel Operations (2004)
 Bret Magnun - Vice-President of Hotel Operations 
 Ninya Perna - Hotel Manager
 Joe Mulligan - Executive Chef
 Willie Bierlien - Banquet Chef
 James Fricker - Pastry Chef
 Alex Peluffo - banquet and Convention Operations
 Dawn Laguardia - Director of Food and Beverage
 Bill Burt - Director of Casino Operations
 Matt Sacca - Director of Player Operations
 Cheryl Rose - Director of Slot Operations
 Fred Tuerck - Assistant Security Manager
 Kelly Downey - Manager, Race and Sports Books
 Lorenzo Fertitta, President, Station Casinos
 Frank Fertitta, Chairman & CEO

Relatively free of interpersonal drama, episodes have included a behind-the-scenes look during rock concerts, slot promotions, blackjack tournaments, weddings, and other events.

Production
Filming began in January 2004, at the Green Valley Ranch hotel and casino in Henderson, Nevada. Approximately 600 hours of footage was shot for the first hour-long episode.

Michael Tata, vice president of hotel operations, died of an accidental fentanyl overdose on July 6, 2004. Prior to Tata's death, more than a dozen additional episodes had been planned for the series' first season, which initially consisted of 13 episodes. The ending of the series' seventh episode, airing on July 16, 2004, acknowledged Tata's death: "In memory of Michael Tata."
In August 2004, the show was renewed for an additional 18 episodes. Later that month, an episode involving Tata's death was delayed without explanation until later in the year.

References

External links
Green Valley Ranch website
American Casino at IMDB

Television shows set in the Las Vegas Valley
2000s American reality television series
2004 American television series debuts
2005 American television series endings
Discovery Channel original programming